Tinatin "Tina" Lekveishvili (born 2 January 1954, in Tbilisi) is a retired Georgian backstroke swimmer who won three medals at the 1970 European Aquatics Championships setting the European record in the 100 m backstroke event. She also participated in the 1968 and 1972 Summer Olympics and finished fourth with the Soviet 4×100 medley relay team in both games. Between 1968 and 1972 she dominated Soviet championships and set three national records in the 100 m and 200 m backstroke events. She graduated from the Tbilisi Medical Institute.

References

1954 births
Living people
Olympic swimmers of the Soviet Union
Swimmers at the 1968 Summer Olympics
Swimmers at the 1972 Summer Olympics
European Aquatics Championships medalists in swimming
Sportspeople from Tbilisi
Soviet female backstroke swimmers
Female backstroke swimmers from Georgia (country)